Sonipat Lok Sabha constituency (earlier spelt as Sonepat) is one of the 10 Lok Sabha (parliamentary) constituencies in Haryana state in northern India.

Assembly segments
At present, Sonipat Lok Sabha constituency comprises nine Vidhan Sabha (legislative assembly) constituencies. These are:

Members of Parliament

Election results

See also
 Sonipat district
 Political families of Haryana

Notes

Lok Sabha constituencies in Haryana
Sonipat district